Dalama  is a town in the central district of Aydın Province, Turkey. The population of the town was 1807 as of 2012. The settlement was founded about 200 years ago by Yörüks (nomadik Turkmens)  who used to form pazar (open market) in the vicinity. During Greek occupation following the First World War Dalama participated in the national resistance and the name of the town is pronounced in the popular epic song of Yörük Ali Efe. The main economic sector is olive farming.

References

Populated places in Aydın Province
Towns in Turkey
Efeler District